Bessonovo is a rural locality (a village) in Annenskoye Rural Settlement, Vytegorsky District, Vologda Oblast, Russia. The population was 74 as of 2002. There are 2 streets.

Geography 
Bessonovo is located 65 km southeast of Vytegra (the district's administrative centre) by road. Veliky Dvor is the nearest rural locality.

References 

Rural localities in Vytegorsky District